Gustavo Nonato Santana (3 March 1998), commonly known as Nonato, is a Brazilian footballer  who plays as a midfielder for Ludogorets Razgrad.

Career
Born São Paulo, Nonato was formed in the youth academy of São Caetano and made his senior debut, making an assist in a 2-0 win over Monte Azul on 30 March 2016 in the Campeonato Paulista Série A2.

Internacional
On 24 May 2018, Nonato signed on loan with Internacional for 1 year.

Fluminense

Ludogorets
On 2 September 2022, Nonato signed with Bulgarian champions Ludogorets Razgrad. On 8 September 2022, he made his official debut for the Razgrad team, coming on as a second half substitute and scoring a late winning goal in the 2:1 home victory over Roma in a UEFA Europa League match.

References

External links
Internacional perfil

Títulos
Campeonato Carioca 2022

1998 births
Living people
Association football defenders
Brazilian footballers
Campeonato Brasileiro Série A players
First Professional Football League (Bulgaria) players
Associação Desportiva São Caetano players
Sport Club Internacional players
Fluminense FC players
PFC Ludogorets Razgrad players
Brazilian expatriate footballers
Expatriate footballers in Bulgaria
Footballers from São Paulo